Doctor Who: The Fan Show (also known as The Aftershow) is a documentary series created by the British Broadcasting Corporation (BBC) to complement the revival of the long-running British science fiction television series Doctor Who. Each episode is broadcast on the official Doctor Who YouTube channel on Saturdays, immediately after the broadcast of the weekly television episode on BBC One. The first series episodes ran between 15 and 20 minutes each.

Development and production
Doctor Who: The Fan Show is a follow up series to Doctor Who Extra, which was the latest after show series for Doctor Who, until the show was axed. The Fan Show series was announced in May 2015, and is presented by Doctor Who fans who have their own YouTube channel of the same name, in which they post weekly videos based on Doctor Who.

Release
Doctor Who: The Fan Show is released on the official Doctor Who YouTube channel straight after the week's episode is broadcast on the main channel, BBC One.

Episodes
The most recent season began released on 15 April 2017. Each episode of The Fan Show features guests such as actors from episodes that have just aired, writers, directors and editors of the show and also behind the scenes clips are shown.

Doctor Who: Series 10 (2017)

Other episodes

References

External links
 Doctor Who: The Fan Show on YouTube
 
 

Works about Doctor Who
BBC Television shows
2017 British television series debuts
2018 British television series endings
2010s British television series
Doctor Who spin-offs
English-language television shows
Aftershows